Édifice Jean-Antoine-Panet is an 8 floor office tower built in 1931, located in Quebec City, Quebec and is part of the complex of buildings of the Government of Quebec. The Beaux-Arts building was designed by architects Lorenzo Auger, Oscar Beaulé and Raoul Chênevert.

It was named in honour of the first speaker of the Legislative Assembly of Lower Canada, Jean-Antoine Panet. It originally housed the Quebec Ministry of Agriculture and since 1985 used as office space by the Quebec National Assembly.

References

 Édifice Jean-Antoine-Panet

Buildings and structures in Quebec City
Quebec government buildings